Losaria rhodifer, the Andaman clubtail, is a rare species of the swallowtail family, Papilionidae, native to India. The butterfly belongs to the genus Losaria, or the clubtails, as they are commonly known.

Distribution
The butterfly is endemic and restricted to the Andaman Islands in the Bay of Bengal.

Description
Male differs from Losaria coon as follows:

Status
It has been described as not rare but much work needs to be done to clarify its exact status and distribution. It is not listed as threatened.

Taxonomy
There are no subspecies.

See also
Papilionidae
List of butterflies of India
List of butterflies of India (Papilionidae)

Cited references

References
 
 
 
 K. Veenakumari & Prashanth Mohanraj, 1994 "Life history of Pachliopta rhodifer (Papilionidae: Troidini)" Journal of the Lepidopterists' Society 1994 Volume 48:111-120 pdf

Losaria
Butterflies of Asia
Butterflies described in 1876